Chambers Creek may refer to:

Chambers Creek (Tennessee River tributary), a stream in Tennessee 
Chambers Creek (Richland Creek tributary), a stream in Texas
Chambers Creek (Washington)